A. lagunensis may refer to:

 Aglaia lagunensis, a Philippine tree
 Asperoseius lagunensis, a mite in the family Phytoseiidae
 Astronia lagunensis, a flowering plant
 Aureoumbra lagunensis, a marine picoplankton